Pitts Hill railway station served the Pitts Hill area of Stoke-on-Trent, Staffordshire, England.

The station closed in 1964. The site has been drastically altered since by the closure and rerouting of the A527 road, although the route of the Potteries Loop Line can still be traced.

References

Disused railway stations in Stoke-on-Trent
Railway stations in Great Britain closed in 1964
Railway stations in Great Britain opened in 1874
Former North Staffordshire Railway stations
Beeching closures in England